Dennis Hediger (born 22 September 1986) is a Swiss former professional footballer who played as a midfielder for FC Thun in the Swiss Super League. He retired at the end of his contract on 1 July 2020.

References

1986 births
Living people
Association football midfielders
Swiss men's footballers
Swiss Super League players
FC Biel-Bienne players
FC Thun players
Footballers from Bern